Jan Bogaert (born 3 December 1957) is a Belgian former road racing cyclist.

Victories

External links 

1957 births
Living people
Belgian male cyclists
People from Temse
Tour de Suisse stage winners
Cyclists from East Flanders
20th-century Belgian people